Pterolophia multituberculosa is a species of beetle in the family Cerambycidae. It was described by Pierre Téocchi in 1986.

References

multituberculosa
Beetles described in 1986